Tarik S. Khan (born ) is an American politician. He is a current Democratic member of the Pennsylvania House of Representatives, representing the 194th District since 2023.

Early life and education
Khan was born in Philadelphia, Pennsylvania, the son of a Pakistani immigrant father and a Catholic mother. Khan grew up Muslim in a Jewish neighborhood in Philadelphia. He graduated from Central High School of Philadelphia in 1996. Khan earned a Bachelor of Arts degree from Davidson College in 2000.  He graduated from Roxborough Memorial Hospital School of Nursing as a Graduate nurse in 2003, and later earned a Master of Science degree in nursing from the School of Nursing at La Salle University. Khan earned a PhD from the University of Pennsylvania in 2022.

Political career
In 2022, Khan defeated incumbent Pennsylvania State Representative Pam DeLissio from the 194th District in a Democratic primary challenge. He then won in the general election, defeating Libertarian nominee Torren Danowski with 90% of the vote.

Electoral history

References

External links

Living people
Democratic Party members of the Pennsylvania House of Representatives
21st-century American politicians
Year of birth missing (living people)